Allan Claud Jephcott (31 October 1890 – 5 October 1950) was an English professional footballer who played as an outside right.

Career
Born in Smethwick, Jephcott moved from Brierley Hill Alliance to West Bromwich Albion in April 1911, signing for a fee of £100. He retired in May 1923, having made 189 appearances for the club in all competitions. He was a war guest for Lincoln City in 1918, making one appearance, and he also guested for Birmingham City, one of five West Bromwich Albion players to do so during World War I.

He made two representative appearances for the Football League, one in 1914 against the Scottish League and one in 1919 against the Irish League.

References

1890 births
1950 deaths
English footballers
Brierley Hill Alliance F.C. players
West Bromwich Albion F.C. players
Birmingham City F.C. wartime guest players
Lincoln City F.C. wartime guest players
English Football League players
Association football outside forwards
FA Cup Final players